The 1901–02 season was Burslem Port Vale's fourth consecutive season (eighth overall) of football in the English Football League. The season was an unremarkable mid-table affair, however was a positive step for the club as they managed to turn a profit without selling any major players.

Overview

Second Division
After an indifferent start to the season, Vale fell apart at the end of 1901, going on a run of five defeats in seven games. However they turned their form around by the end of the season, going five games unbeaten in March. Vale finished in thirteenth place, but only six points separated seventh spot from the re-election zones. As it happened Chesterfield, Stockport County, and Gainsborough Trinity all won re-election. However West Bromwich Albion and Middlesbrough ran away with the league, leaving Vale 22 points off a promotion place.

A settled side saw Lucien Boullemier, Ernest Mullineux, George Price, and Adrian Capes ever-presents in the league. Capes was leading scorer with eighteen goals, with Danny Simpson's twelve goal haul a major contribution to the campaign. At the end of the season centre-half Jim Beech retired, having spent eight years with the club.

Finances
On the financial front things were looking up for the club. A £368 profit was made, with most of this figure coming from the club's annual Easter bazaar at Burslem Town Hall. This upturn in finances caused the directors to loosen their unwritten rule on only recruiting local players.

Cup competitions
In the FA Cup the club decimated Wellington Town 6–0, before beating Wrexham after two replays. The first encounter with Wrexham was called off due to fog, the rearranged tie resulted in a 2–1 defeat, however a replay was scheduled when it was discovered that their opponents had fielded an ineligible player. Eventually vanquishing the Welsh side, the next round saw Walsall knock the Vale out before the First Round Proper. In the Birmingham Senior Cup the "Valeites" defeated local rivals 4–0 Stoke in a First Round replay, after a 2–2 draw at Stoke. Vale lost in the semi-final in a replay with Wolverhampton Wanderers. In the Staffordshire Senior Cup Vale brushed aside Walsall 5–2, before Stoke took their revenge in the semi-final, with a 2–1 victory over Vale in Cobridge.

League table

Results

Burslem Port Vale's score comes first

Football League Second Division

Results by matchday

Matches

FA Cup

Birmingham Senior Cup

Staffordshire Senior Cup

Player statistics

Appearances

Top scorers

Transfers

Transfers in

Transfers out

References
Specific

General

Port Vale F.C. seasons
Burslem Port Vale